is one of Japan's largest consumer loan companies, (or sarakin). The name "Acom" stands for Affection, Confidence and Moderation. The company was founded by Masao Kinoshita, who was later replaced by his eldest son Kyosuke Kinoshita, the current chairman of the company. In addition to providing loans, Acom issues credit cards.

At the end of 2008, Mitsubishi UFJ obtained control of more than 40% of Acom stock and Acom became a consolidated subsidiary of MUFG.

Ownership 

As of April 2009, the founders (Maruito/Kinoshita) control about 40% of the shares, another 40% are controlled by MUFG.

References

External links 
 

Financial services companies established in 1978
Financial services companies based in Tokyo
Japanese companies established in 1978
Mitsubishi UFJ Financial Group
Companies listed on the Tokyo Stock Exchange